Rajamanikyam is a 2005 Indian Malayalam-language action comedy film directed by Anwar Rasheed and written by T. A. Shahid. It stars Mammootty in the title role along with Rahman, Manoj K Jayan, Cochin Haneefa, Ranjith, Salim Kumar, Sai Kumar, Bheeman Raghu, Sindhu Menon, and Padmapriya in supporting roles. The music is composed by Alex Paul.

It tells the story of Rajamanikyam aka Bellary Raja (Mammootty), a Karnataka based illiterate business tycoon who tries to unite his warring siblings. The film was remade in Kannada as Bellary Naga (2009) with Vishnuvardhan in lead and in Bengali as Rajkumar with Prosenjit Chatterjee in the lead. Rajamanikyam was the highest grossing Malayalam movie until 2008. The film was released on November 1 during Deepawali. The film was dubbed and released in Tamil with same name in 2007.

Plot
In a village in Southern Kerala bordering Tamil Nadu lives a wealthy and respectful businessman named Raja Rathnam Pillai. Following the demise of his first wife, he marries Muthu Lakshmi Ammal so that Raja Selvam, the child from his first marriage will not grow up without the love and care of a mother. Unknown to him, Muthu Lakshmi already has a son, whom she calls Muthu.

On the night of the wedding, Muthu knocks at the door of Raja Rathnam Pillai, demanding that he be shown his mother. Once Raja Rathnam realises the truth, he takes Muthu into his care, giving him love, affection and a new name, "Rajamanikyam". Muthu returns the favour duly, as when Raja Rathnam's son ends up killing one of the children of the village, he takes up the blame and leaves the village.

Several years later, Raja Rathnam's two grown-up children, Raja Selvam and Rani Rathnam (Muthu Lakshmi's daughter), quarrel for their father's wealth. Rajaselvam, aided by his childhood buddy Simon Nadar also notches up a plot to frame his own father in a murder case. Raja Rathnam is implicated in a sensitive political murder. As a result, Rathnam is arrested and remanded. While taking Rathnam to the prison from the premises of the court, a wide scale altercation erupts - between Rathnam's supporters and the sycophants of the slain politician. Amidst the chaos, a huge stone is pelted at Rathnam - severely injuring him. (The stone is pelted by the actual assailant). Witnessing the riots, Rathnam dies of a heart attack - sitting inside the police van - while being taken to the prison.

After his death the two siblings are summoned by the family lawyer to read out the provisions of Raja Rathnam's will. But to their surprise, they find that control of all the assets of their father have been transferred to a Bellary based businessman named Bellary Raja. They fail to recognize that Bellary Raja is none other than Rajamanikyam. How Rajamanikyam returns to his home town to unite the warring siblings forms the rest of the story.

During the course of the movie, Raja Selvam and Rani Rathnam tries to thwart Bellary Raja in order to regain control of their father's wealth. But Bellary Raja never falls for any of their attempts and he uses his adopted brother and Manager, educated Raju to stabilize the assets of his stepfather and prevents it from getting into the hands of his siblings, thereby preserving it. Raja effectively uses the help of his thug friends to restore order in the establishment. Bellary's identity of Rajamanikyam is revealed by himself at a crucial juncture and revelation stuns the entire family. Simon and Raja Selvam sends a goon to kill Bellary from his blind side. However Bellary thwarts the attempt, lightly wounding him.

Differences emerge between Raja Selvam and Simon Nadar regarding a financial liability. Simon betrays Selvam him and he is held captive by a boorish Tamil moneylender - who demands the repayment for the release of Raja Selvam. Rani - unaware of the latter developments - blames Manikyam in order to deny them their claim over their father's wealth. Manikyam comes to the rescue and pays the required amount of money to release Raja Selvam. He emotionally narrates his hardships and love for his siblings - stirring the emotions of his mother and siblings. Feeling deeply disappointed - on being unable  to fulfill his father's wish to unite their family, Manikyam prepares to leave for Bellary.

At night Raja Selvam, being absolutely drunk and weeping comes to Manikyam's house and apologizes for all his past deeds and embraces him - burying all differences. He asks Manikyam not to leave them. Manikyam is deeply moved and laments that, Raja Rathnam was unfortunate as he 'left early' (An untimely death) and he could not witness the conciliation. Varghese, a close confidant of Raja Rathnam, reveals that, Rathnam was rather 'packed off' (A murder) - resulting in the narration of the deceit and Manikyam and acolytes go in search for the actual assailant. When the latter individual is caught, he reveals the main conspirator, Simon Nadar. Towards the end of the movie, Raja Selvam and Simon Nadar gets into a duel. Selvam, beaten badly by Simon Nadar and his goons was about to be killed. However, Bellary and his men came to rescue and fight off Simon.

At the Climax, Bellari releases a bull towards Simon for killing his father and trying to destroy his family and kills him. He reunites with Rajaselvam and takes him home. The movie ends when Rajamanikyam, who is half-blind, says, "Now I have both eyes", signifying Raju (whom he considers a brother) and Raja Selvam.

Cast 

 Mammootty as Manikyam aka Rajamanikyam/Bellary Raja (son of Raja Rathnam Pillai), a cattle dealer and businessman in Bellary, Karnataka, who come to unite his warring siblings.
 Ashwin as Young Rajamanikyam
 Rahman as Raju, Manikyam's brother and educated manager.
 Manoj K. Jayan as Rajaselvam (son of Raja Rathnam Pillai and Manikyam's Stepbrother .)
 Ranjith as Simon Nadar (friend and partner of Rajaselvam)
 Sai Kumar as Raja Rathnam Pillai, father of Manikyam ,Raju , Selvam's and Rani's father wealthy businessman.
 Cochin Haneefa as Varghese, Raja Ratnam's friend.
 Bheeman Raghu as Varkeychan, Manikyam's friend.
 Salim Kumar as Dasappan
 Padmapriya Janakiraman as Malli / Chellakkili, a flower seller.
 Sindhu Menon as Rani Rathnam
 Chitra Shenoy as Muthulakshmi Ammal, Rajarathnam's wife and Manikyam's and Rani's mother and Selvam's Stepmother
 Suresh Krishna as Ramesh, Rani Ratnam's spouse, Manikyam's brother-in-law.
 Baburaj as Vikraman, C. I of police, Tamil Nadu
 Maniyanpilla Raju as Advocate Shivadaas Menon 
 T. P. Madhavan as College Principal
 Dhandapani as Perumal
 Vijay Menon as Adv. Lal Cherian, an advocate arranged by Nadar.
 Abu Salim as Goonda sent by Raja Selvam to kill Manikyam.
 Santhosh Jogi as Goonda, an assassin, sent by Simon Nadar to trap Raja Ratnam Pillai and who throws a stone at him at court
 Kalabhavan Shajohn as Finance Manager, spy of Raja Selvam.
 Nivia Rebin as Kanakambaram, Malli's younger sister

Narayanankutty and Pradeep Kottayam appear as board members of Rajarathnam group. Biju Sopanam appears in an uncredited role as an aide to the assassin, played by Santosh jogi.

Production 
Actor Suraj Venjaramoodu was roped in to help Mammootty get the hang of the slang spoken in the border areas of Trivandrum. Mammootty was highly praised for rendering the slang efficiently and that contributed greatly to it becoming a mega mass film. Rajamanikyam was completed in Pollachi in a record time of 55 days.

Box office
The film was released to high expectations, with Valiyaveethil Films collecting ₹2 crore from theatre advances for the film. It was released on 4 November 2005 in 45 theatres in Kerala, on the occasion of Ramzan, along with Ananthabhadram and Boyy Friennd. The film was a major commercial success and became the highest grossing Malayalam film until 2008. The film ran for more than 140 days in the theaters. It is the first Malayalam film to have ₹1 crore center gross from Ernakulam. The film completed its 100 days at Kavitha, Ernakulam, from where it got a record distributors' share of Rs. 42 lakhs. The film collected close to ₹25 crore from Kerala alone making it the highest grossing Malayalam film until 2008.

Legacy
The character of Bellary Raja attained cult status in Kerala. The dialogues of the film were referred to in many other films most noteworthy being in Malayalam film Premam (during the second intro of Nivin Pauly). Moreover, the costumes of Mammootty in the film went onto become a trend setter in Kerala. Mammotty's dialogue in the film, "Yevan Puliyanuketta…." has become an iconic Malayalam catchphrase.

References

External links 

 

2005 films
2000s Malayalam-language films
Malayalam films remade in other languages
Indian action comedy films
Films shot in Pollachi
Indian family films
2005 directorial debut films
Films directed by Anwar Rasheed